Johanna Skottheim (born 29 May 1994) is a Swedish female biathlete. In the first competition of the 2020/2021 season, she earned her first World Cup podium.

Biathlon results
All results are sourced from the International Biathlon Union.

World Championships

World Cup

Individual podiums
 0 victories 
 1 podiums

Team podiums
1 victories 
2 podiums  

*Results are from IBU races which include the Biathlon World Cup, Biathlon World Championships and the Winter Olympic Games.

Updated on 22 March 2021

References

External links

1994 births
Swedish female biathletes
Living people
People from Malung-Sälen Municipality